The Government Junta of Chile was the military junta established to rule Chile during the military dictatorship that followed the overthrow of President Salvador Allende in the 1973 Chilean coup d'état. The Government Junta was the executive and legislative branch of government until December 17, 1974, when Augusto Pinochet rose was formally declared President of Chile in late 1974. After that date, it functioned strictly as a legislative body until the return to democracy in 1990.

Installation of the regime

On September 11, 1973, the day of the coup, the military officers issued an Act of Constitution. The act established a junta government that immediately suspended the constitution, suspended Congress, imposed strict censorship and curfew, proscribed the leftist parties that had constituted Salvador Allende's Popular Unity coalition, and halted all political activity, effectively establishing a dictatorship. The judicial branch continued to operate under the Junta, and nominally had jurisdiction over its repressive activities, but rarely interfered. 

The new junta was made up of General Gustavo Leigh representing the Air Force, General Augusto Pinochet representing the Army, Admiral José Toribio Merino representing the Navy, and General César Mendoza representing the Carabineros (police). 

The Nixon administration, which had worked to create the conditions for the coup, promptly recognized the junta government and supported it in consolidating power.

History and leadership
Once the Junta was in power, General Pinochet soon consolidated his control. Since he was the commander-in-chief of the oldest branch of the military forces (the Army), he was made the head of the military junta. This position was originally to be rotated among the four branches, but was later made permanent. He began by retaining sole chairmanship of the junta as "Supreme Chief of the Nation" from June 27, 1974 until December 17, 1974, when he was proclaimed President.  Gustavo Leigh, commander of the Air Force, opposed the consolidation of the legislative and executive branches, but agreed to Pinochet's presidency under pressure from Merino and Mendoza, who warned that the junta would split otherwise if he did not sign on. 

General Leigh, head of the Air Force, became increasingly opposed to Pinochet's policies and the permanent state of  military government. Pinochet eventually tired of Leigh's opposition and dismissed him from the regime in 1978, declaring him unfit for office and forcing him into retirement on July 24, 1978, in a very tense moment that almost caused a military insurrection. Airforce General Fernando Matthei replaced Leigh as junta member. Leigh was replaced by General Fernando Matthei.

General Pinochet took over as President following a referendum that approved a new constitution. On March 11, 1981, he resigned his position in the Junta, and was replaced by the most senior General officer from the Army, who was nominated by himself. After that date, the Junta remained only as a legislative body under the presidency of Admiral Merino, until the return to democracy in 1990.

In 1985, three communists were found with murdered, with their throats slit, by the side of a road. The guilty party turned out to be the Carabineros' secret service, and the Caso Degollados ("case of the slit throats") caused General César Mendoza's resignation on August 2, 1985. Mendoza was replaced by General Rodolfo Stange. Stange, who had risen through the ranks of the Carabineros to become General Subdirector of the police force in 1982, was appointed to General Director and served ex officio as a member of the military junta. Stange continued serving as general director after Pinochet's dictatorship ended in 1990. As of 2021, Stange is the military junta's last surviving member; he also served as a senator after the return to democracy.

Political repression and human rights abuses

Immediately after the coup the junta moved to crush their left-wing opposition. Besides pursuing revolutionary guerilla groups, the junta embarked on a campaign against political opponents and perceived leftists in the country, as well as family members of dissidents. According to the Rettig Commission, 2,279 people who disappeared were killed for political reasons or by political violence, and 27,000 incarcerated, most of them for long periods of time, without trials and in special secluded facilities in remote locations. According to the 2004 Valech Report, approximately 32,000 people were tortured, and 1,312 officially exiled. Among the cases of torture were approximately 3,400 cases of sexual abuse of women. 

Many of the exiled were received abroad, in particular in Argentina, East Germany and Sweden, as political refugees; however, they were followed in their exile by the DINA secret police, in the frame of Operation Condor which linked South-American dictatorships together against political opponents. Intelligence agencies including the United States CIA worked to assassinate many of those in exile around the world, including former Chilean ambassador to the United States Orlando Letelier and former Chilean President Eduardo Frei Montalva (1964-70).

Leaders

Members

See also
 1973 Chilean coup d'état
 Project FUBELT
 Military dictatorship of Chile (1973–1990)
 History of Chile
 List of Government Juntas of Chile
 No (film about the return to democracy)

Notes

Chile, 1973
Government of Chile
Military dictatorship of Chile (1973–1990)
1973 establishments in Chile
1990 disestablishments in Chile